Narikala is an ancient fortress overlooking Tbilisi, the capital of Georgia, and the Mtkvari (Kura) River. The fortress consists of two walled sections on a steep hill between the sulfur baths and the botanical gardens of Tbilisi. On the lower court there is the recently restored St Nicholas church. Newly built in 1996–1997, it replaces the original 13th-century church that was destroyed in a fire. The new church is of "prescribed cross" type, having doors on three sides. The internal part of the church is decorated with the frescos showing scenes from both the Bible and the history of Georgia.

History

According to the legend it was built by the king Vakhtang I Gorgasali of ancient Kingdom of Iberia.

Archaeological studies of the region have however revealed that the territory of Tbilisi was settled by humans as early as the 4th millennium BC. The earliest written accounts of settlement of the location come from the second half of the 4th century AD, when a fortress was built during King Varaz-Bakur's reign (ca. 364). Towards the end of the 4th century the fortress fell into the hands of the Persians, but was recaptured by the kings of Kartli by the middle of the 5th century.
 It was considerably expanded by the Umayyads in the 7th century and by king David the Builder (1089–1125), respectively. The Mongols renamed it the "Narin Qala" (i.e., "Little Fortress"). Most of extant fortifications date from the 16th and 17th centuries. In 1827, parts of the fortress were damaged by an earthquake, and were subsequently demolished.

Gallery

References

External links

 
 Narikala on Geocities
 Narikala on World66
 Narikala on the official website of the City of Tbilisi

Buildings and structures in Tbilisi
Castles and forts in Georgia (country)
Tourist attractions in Tbilisi